The 1981 Skate Canada International was held in Ottawa, Ontario. Medals were awarded in the disciplines of men's singles, ladies' singles, and ice dancing.

Results

Men
Norbert Schramm won the compulsory figures, and took both second places in short program and free skating (receiving in free skating five 5.7 marks for technical merit and five 5.8 for artistic impression). Brian Orser was only 4th in the figures, but he was 1st in the short, and won the free, completed a triple Axel jump, received seven 5.9 for technical merit. Vitaly Egorov also have trying a triple Axel.

Ladies
Tracey Wainman captured first place, being only third in each part of competition (figures, short, and free). Rosalynn Sumners won the free skating.

Ice dancing

References

Skate Canada International, 1981
Skate Canada International
1981 in Canadian sports
1981 in Ontario